IPPOLIT is an open-source chess program released by authors using pseudonyms, Yakov Petrovich Golyadkin, Igor Igorovich Igoronov, Roberto Pescatore, Yusuf Ralf Weisskopf, Ivan Skavinsky Skavar, and Decembrists.

The program is a console application that communicates with a chess Graphical User Interface (GUI)  via standard Universal Chess Interface protocol. IPPOLIT is a bitboard chess engine optimized for 64-bit architecture with native support for both 32-bit/64-bit Linux and Windows operating systems. With about 3100 ELO it is listed in TOP 50 strongest chess programs.

Releases
 IPPOLIT, released on May 2, 2009, was the first release of the series. It was split in multiple usenet messages.
 RobboLito, released in September 2009, was the second installment of the IPPOLIT series. Endgame tablebase, RobboBases support was introduced.
 Igorrit, released in January 2010, added Multi-core support, and was the third installment of the IPPOLIT series.
 IvanHoe, released in January 2010, is the fourth and current project code name of the IPPOLIT series. It features, but not limited to, Multi-PV, Monte-Carlo Tree Search, and Chess960. IvanHoe uses a decrementing versioning scheme. The latest release includes source-code for a Java GUI, ComradesGUI.

Controversy
IPPOLIT was initially prohibited from many computer chess websites after the author of the chess engine Rybka claimed it to be a clone of his program. IPPOLIT authors have denied the accusation. Even today, some chess rating lists still refuse to include it in their lists of tested programs.

References

External links
 

2009 software
Chess engines
Public-domain software with source code
Free software